Mads Nordam (born 14 May 1995) is a Danish footballer who plays for the Danish 1st Division club Næstved BK.

Career

Lyngby Boldklub
On 5 July 2014 it was announced, that Lyngby Boldklub had signed Nordam from the youth sector of F.C. Copenhagen.

Fremad Amager
On 22 December 2016 Lyngby confirmed, that Nordam had signed a contract with Danish 1st Division-side Fremad Amager.

References

External links
 Mads Nordam at DBU
 

Danish men's footballers
Danish Superliga players
1995 births
Living people
Lyngby Boldklub players
Association football midfielders
Footballers from Copenhagen
Fremad Amager players
Danish 1st Division players